GBA-16 (Diamer-II) is a constituency of Gilgit Baltistan Assembly which is currently represented by Muhammad Anwar of Pakistan Muslim League (N).

Members

Election results

2009
Janbaz Khan of Pakistan Muslim League (N) became member of assembly by getting 2,403 votes.

2015
Janbaz Khan of Pakistan Muslim League (N) won this seat again by getting 3,327 votes.

References

Gilgit-Baltistan Legislative Assembly constituencies